Kalifa is a given name or a surname derived from caliph and caliphate

Khalifa or Khalifah is a name or title which means "successor", "leader" or "ruler". It most commonly refers to the leader of a Caliphate, but is also used as a title among various Islamic religious groups and orders. Khalifa is sometimes also pronounced as "kalifa".

People
Given name
Kalifa Cissé (born 1984), Malian footballer
Kalifa Coulibaly (born 1991), Malian footballer
Kalifa Faifai Loa (born 1990), New Zealand rugby league footballer
Kalifa Kambi (1955–2011), Gambian politician and government minister. Also member of the African Union's Pan-African Parliament from Gambia
Kalifa Tillisi (1930–2010), Libyan historian, translator, and linguist
Kalifa Traoré (born 1991), Malian footballer

Surname
Dominique Kalifa, French historian, professor
Moussa Mohamed Kalifa (born 1967), Libyan citizen who was charged with being a member of the Libyan Islamic Fighting Group, and accused of participating in terrorism after he attempted to move to Canada as a refugee under a false name in 2001
Sahim Omar Kalifa (born 1980), Belgian-Kurdish filmmaker

Fictional characters
Kalifa (One Piece), character in the manga and anime series One Piece

House of Khalifa
 Isa bin Salman Al Khalifa
 Hamad bin Isa Al Khalifa, King of Bahrain
 Meriam Al Khalifa

See also
Khalifa (disambiguation)
Sayyid Muhammad Sharif (Kalifa) (died 1899), one of the three Kalifas or lieutenants of Muhammad Ahmad (1844-1885), who styled himself in Sudan as the Mahdi
The Steel Lady, aka Treasure of Kalifa, American action film